Robert Timothy Monagan, Jr. (July 5, 1920 – January 7, 2009) was a California politician and a member of the Republican Party, who was Speaker of the California State Assembly from 1969–1970.  He served in the California State Assembly, representing the 12th district from 1961 until 1973.

Born in Ogden, Utah, Monagan grew up in Vallejo, California and earned his Bachelor of Science in Business Administration in 1942 from the College of the Pacific (later the University of the Pacific), where he played basketball and was student body president.

From 1943–1946, including during World War II, he served as a United States Coast Guard officer, seeing duty in the Aleutian Islands.

After the war, he returned to California to become the graduate manager of athletics for the University of the Pacific.

Monagan moved to Tracy, California in 1950 to be secretary-manager of the Tracy Chamber of Commerce.

In 1952, he became chief of staff for Congressman Leroy Johnson in Washington, D.C.  Monagan returned to Tracy in 1954 to begin working in insurance and real estate, eventually founding Monagan-Miller-McInerney Insurance, which eventually became the largest insurance agency in the region surrounding Tracy.

He was elected to the Tracy City Council in 1958 and became mayor in 1960. That same year, he was elected for the California State Assembly to represent 12th District.

Monagan was re-elected five more times. He became Assembly Republican Leader in 1965 and held that post until becoming Speaker of the Assembly in 1969.  After the 1970 elections, Monagan again became Assembly Republican Leader and held that post until becoming United States Assistant Secretary of Transportation in 1973, holding that position until 1974.

In 1974, Monagan returned to California to become vice president (and later president) of the California Manufacturers and Technology Association. In 1984, he left the CMTA to become president of the California Economic Development Corporation, serving until 1994.

A portion of the I-205 which runs through Tracy which is named after him.

Monagan served on the Board of Regents of the University of the Pacific from 1991 to April 2007, including nine years as Chairman, and the University's Monagan Hall is named for him and his wife.  Monagan Hall is a student housing complex consisting of four-bedroom suites available only to juniors and seniors.

With his wife, Ione, he had one son, Michael and one daughter, Marilee.

Books 

The Disappearance of Representative Government: A California Solution (1990) .

References

1920 births
2009 deaths
Speakers of the California State Assembly
Republican Party members of the California State Assembly
20th-century American politicians
Politicians from Vallejo, California
American military personnel of World War II